Bitam is a town in northern Gabon on the N2 road on the border with Cameroon. As of the 2013 census, its population is 27,923.

It is home to a large market and an airport.

A small Jewish community composed of former Christians has developed in Bitam. The community practices Jewish customs, but does not yet have a synagogue.

Climate

References

Jewish communities
Jews and Judaism in Gabon
Populated places in Woleu-Ntem Province
Cameroon–Gabon border crossings